Jayaraj Warrier is an Indian actor, stand-up comedian, Ottamthullal performer, and caricaturist. He appears in Malayalam films in supporting and comedic roles.

Personal life
He hails from Thrissur, began his career as an amateur theater artist in 1982 after studying Ottamthullal, was part of the Root Theater Group led by Jose Chirammel for seven years from 1984.  His daughter Indulekha Warrier is also a stage performer and playback singer, she made her debut as music composer in "Duniyavinte Orattathu".  He had played noted roles in many stage such as Mudrarakshasam, Bhomaolpadanathinte Sooryavetta, Chathuppil Parkkunnavar and Shavaghoshayathra.  He is also an eminent caricaturist who had conducted many caricature shows inside and abroad the country. He had performed a caricature show for the members in the Kerala Assembly in July 2003, which was the first time ever in the history of the Assembly. In 2010, he received the Kerala Sangeetha Nataka Akademi Award for his contributions to Drama and Caricature. He is an alumnus of St. Aloysius College, Thrissur.

Filmography

Films

Television

References

External links

Living people
Indian caricaturists
Indian male film actors
Indian impressionists (entertainers)
21st-century Indian male actors
Indian male television actors
Indian male comedians
Malayalam comedians
20th-century Indian male actors
Male actors in Malayalam television
Male actors from Thrissur
1963 births
Recipients of the Kerala Sangeetha Nataka Akademi Award